Coleophora demissella is a moth of the family Coleophoridae. It is found in the eastern United States.

The larvae feed on the leaves of Prunus demissa.

References

demissella
Moths described in 1914
Moths of North America